Anthony Joe (born 2 April 1996) is an Australian badminton player. In 2016, he won the silver medal at the Oceania Championships in the mixed doubles event partnered with Joy Lai. He also won the bronze medals in the men's singles and doubles event. Joe was awarded a full blue award by the Australian National University, for his excellence and contribution to sport & recreation during the 2016 calendar year.

Achievements

Oceania Championships 
Men's singles

Men's doubles

Mixed doubles

BWF International Challenge/Series 
Men's doubles

  BWF International Challenge tournament
  BWF International Series tournament
  BWF Future Series tournament

References

External links 
 
 

Living people
1996 births
Sportspeople from Canberra
Australian people of Chinese descent
Australian male badminton players
Badminton players at the 2018 Commonwealth Games
Commonwealth Games competitors for Australia